William Boyd, FRCPath,  (June 21, 1885 – March 10, 1979) was a Scottish-Canadian physician, pathologist, academic, and author known for his medical textbooks.

Biography
William was born in Portsoy, Scotland, the sixth child of Dugald Cameron Boyd (a Presbyterian clergyman) and Eliza Marion (née Butcher) Boyd.  Educated at the University of Edinburgh, he graduated M.B. Ch.B. in 1908, M.D. in 1911, and went on to become trained and accredited as a neurologist, psychiatrist, and pathologist.  Boyd worked as an attending physician and nominal pathologist at the Derby County Asylum in the English Midlands from 1909–1912, and at Winwick Hospital (another neuropsychiatric facility) from 1912–1913.  He was a pathologist at Wolverhampton Royal Infirmary from 1913 to August 1914. During World War I, Boyd served as a general medical officer in the Royal Army Medical Corps in Flanders at the rank of captain (O3). In 1916 he wrote the book, With a Field Ambulance at Ypres, describing his experiences as both a physician and an ordinary combatant in the war zone.

After the conflict, Boyd moved to Canada at the urging of friends from medical school who were already working there.  He married Enid Christie, the daughter of a Presbyterian minister, in Winnipeg, Manitoba in June 1919.  Boyd became a Professor of Pathology in the Manitoba Medical College at the University of Manitoba in Winnipeg and over the next 22 years, he wrote several pathology textbooks that were published and read internationally.  These earned him worldwide recognition and financial security. In 1937, he moved to the University of Toronto in Toronto, Ontario and, ultimately, in 1951 to the University of British Columbia in Vancouver, British Columbia. Boyd continued to be an active lecturer on medical-pathological topics well into this 80s [???Check. Boyd died in 1979], and spoke in many different countries.

In 1968, he was made a Companion of the Order of Canada, Canada's highest civilian honor, "for his services as a pathologist and as a founding member of the National Cancer Institute".  Boyd died of pneumonia at the age of 93 in Toronto. He was survived by his wife Enid; the couple had had no children.

Selected works
 Pathology for Surgeons (1925)
 Pathology of Internal Disease (1931)
 Textbook of Pathology (1932)
 Introduction to Medical Science (1937)

See also
 Pathology
 List of pathologists

References

External links
 With a field ambulance at Ypres: being letters written March 7 – August 15, 1915 at the Internet Archive
 William Boyd at The Canadian Encyclopedia
 William Boyd Museum of Pathology at the Vancouver General Hospital

1885 births
1979 deaths
Alumni of the University of Edinburgh
Canadian pathologists
Companions of the Order of Canada
People from Banff and Buchan
Royal Army Medical Corps officers
Scottish expatriates in Canada
Scottish pathologists
British pathologists
Academic staff of the University of British Columbia
Academic staff of the University of Manitoba
Academic staff of the University of Toronto
British Army personnel of World War I
Deaths from pneumonia in Ontario